Westport Covered Bridge is a historic covered bridge located in Sand Creek Township, Decatur County, Indiana. It was built in 1880, and is a single span, Burr arch bridge on limestone abutments.  It measures 130 feet long, 16 feet wide and 13 feet high.  It is topped by a gable roof and sided with shiplap siding.  It has been limited to pedestrian traffic since 1973.

It is one of numerous covered bridges built by A. M. Kennedy & Sons.

It was added to the National Register of Historic Places in 1982.

References

Covered bridges on the National Register of Historic Places in Indiana
Bridges completed in 1880
Transportation buildings and structures in Decatur County, Indiana
National Register of Historic Places in Decatur County, Indiana
Road bridges on the National Register of Historic Places in Indiana
Wooden bridges in Indiana
Burr Truss bridges in the United States